"Spring Fever" is a song written by Lola Jean Dillon that was originally performed by American country music artist Loretta Lynn. It was released as a single in May 1978 via MCA Records.

Background and reception 
"Spring Fever" was recorded at the Bradley's Barn on December 1, 1978. Located in Mount Juliet, Tennessee, the session was produced by renowned country music producer Owen Bradley. Two additional tracks were recorded during this session. 

"Spring Fever" reached number twelve on the Billboard Hot Country Singles survey in 1978. Additionally, the song peaked at number ten on the Canadian RPM Country Songs chart during this same period. It was included on her studio album, Out of My Head and Back in My Bed (1978).

Track listings 
7" vinyl single
 "Spring Fever" – 2:40
 "God Bless the Children" – 2:28

Charts

References 

1978 songs
1978 singles
MCA Records singles
Loretta Lynn songs
Song recordings produced by Owen Bradley
Songs written by Lola Jean Dillon